"You're the First, the Last, My Everything" is a song recorded by American singer and songwriter Barry White from his third studio album, Can't Get Enough (1974). The song was written by White, Tony Sepe and Peter Radcliffe and produced by White. It reached number two on the US Billboard Hot 100 and number one on the UK Singles Chart. The song was certified Gold by the Recording Industry Association of America (RIAA) in 1974, and certified silver by the British Phonographic Industry (BPI), also in 1974.

Background
Peter Radcliffe originally wrote the track as a country song with the title "You're My First, You're My Last, My In-Between", which went unrecorded for 21 years. White recorded it as a disco song, retaining most of the musical structure while rewriting the lyrics.

Chart performance
"You're the First, the Last, My Everything" was White's fourth top ten hit on the US Billboard Hot 100 singles chart, reaching number two.  It was kept out of the number one spot by "Lucy in the Sky with Diamonds" by Elton John. It spent a week at number one on the Billboard Hot Soul Singles chart. The track made it to number two on the disco/dance charts. On the UK Singles Chart it fared even better, spending two weeks at the top in December 1974.

Charts

Weekly charts

Year-end charts

Certifications
"You're the First, the Last, My Everything" was certified Gold by the RIAA on December 18, 1974. It was certified silver for 200,000 sold copies in United Kingdom in 1974.

Howard Brown version
A cover version of the song performed by Howard Brown was released in 2005 in the UK as a charity single. It peaked at #13 in the UK singles chart. Prior to its release it had been adapted for a popular television commercial for Halifax Bank in which Brown could be seen singing and dancing.

Ally McBeal
The Ally McBeal character John Cage draws inspiration from this song. Barry White personally sang it on the episodes "Those Lips, That Hand" and the series finale "Bygones".

References

External links
 [ Song Review] from AllMusic

1974 songs
1974 singles
2005 singles
Barry White songs
Songs written by Barry White
Disco songs
Cashbox number-one singles
Number-one singles in Spain
UK Singles Chart number-one singles
20th Century Fox Records singles
Charity singles